(Polish:) is a village in Frýdek-Místek District, Moravian-Silesian Region, Czech Republic. It was a separate municipality but became administratively a part of Třinec in 1960. It lies on the border with Poland, in the historical region of Cieszyn Silesia and has a population of 311 (1 January 2008).

Until the 1920 division of Cieszyn Silesia between Poland and Czechoslovakia it was a part of the village of Leszna Górna, which now lies in Poland.

See also 
 Dolní Líštná
 Leszna Górna
 Polish minority in the Czech Republic
 Zaolzie

Footnotes

References 
 

Třinec
Villages in Frýdek-Místek District
Neighbourhoods in the Czech Republic